The Stella Prize is an Australian annual literary award established in 2013 for writing by Australian women in all genres, worth $50,000. It was originally proposed by Australian women writers and publishers in 2011, modelled on the UK's Baileys Women's Prize for Fiction (formerly the Orange Prize for Fiction).

The award derives its name from the author Miles Franklin, whose full name was "Stella Maria Sarah Miles Franklin."

It was established by a group of 11 Australian women writers, editors, publishers and booksellers who became concerned about the poor representation of books by women in Australia's top literary prize, the Miles Franklin Award.

"After a rapid acceleration in women's rights in the '70s and '80s, things have started to go backwards," Sophie Cunningham said in a keynote address at the 2011 Melbourne Writers' Festival. "Women continue to be marginalised in Australian culture and the arts sector – which likes to pride itself on its liberal values – is, in fact, complacent. Women are much less likely to win literary awards, to write reviews of books, or have their books reviewed. This, despite the fact they write about half the books published."

Some commentators, such as Erin Handley writing in The Age, have said that fiction and non-fiction are different genres that should be judged separately, highlighting that this is an issue for the Stella Prize. But this is rejected by Dr. Kerryn Goldsworthy, the chair of the Stella judging panel, who stated that comparing fiction and non-fiction is "no harder than comparing books in general," and that "excellence is achievable in any form."

The 2021 Stella Prize guidelines opened entries to books by non-binary as well as women writers.

Award honorees

See also

 List of literary awards honoring women
 Sophie Cunningham

References

External links 

Stella Prize website

Awards established in 2013
2013 establishments in Australia
Literary awards honoring women
Australian fiction awards
21st-century literary awards
English-language literary awards